Spelled in Bones is the third album by American folk-rock band Fruit Bats, released in 2005.

Track listing
"Lives of Crime" – 3:53
"Silent Life" – 3:12
"TV Waves" – 3:43
"Canyon Girl" – 2:41
"Born in the '70s" – 3:08
"Legs of Bees" – 4:03
"The Earthquake of '73" – 3:20
"Traveler's Song" – 2:48
"The Wind That Blew My Heart Away" – 2:43
"Spelled in Bones" – 3:44
"Everyday That We Wake Up It's a Beautiful Day" – 2:26

References

Fruit Bats (band) albums
2005 albums
Sub Pop albums